Jan Roskam (February 22, 1930 – September 9, 2022) was the Deane E. Ackers Distinguished Professor of Aerospace Engineering at the University of Kansas. He is the author of eleven books on airplane design and flight dynamics and over 160 papers on the topics of aircraft aerodynamics, performance, design and flight controls. He founded the company DARcorporation with Willem Anemaat.

Biography

Education
Born in The Hague, Roskam received his engineer's degree in aeronautical engineering in 1954 from the Delft University of Technology followed by a Ph.D. degree from the University of Washington in aeronautics and astronautics in 1965.

Professional career
Roskam has been involved in the design and development of 36 aircraft programs, including 12 which made it to flight, while working for three major aircraft companies. He was actively involved in design and development of the Boeing SST, Cessna Citation I, and Learjet 35. He also acted as a consultant on the Boeing 747. He is proudest of his work on the Piaggio P-180 Avanti.

In 1967 he became Professor of Aerospace Engineering at the University of Kansas. He served as chairman of the department from 1972 to 1976 and was recognized as the Ackers Distinguished Professor of Aerospace Engineering from 1974 until his retirement in 2003. During his time at the university he continued to serve as a member of various advisory committees to NASA and was a member of the X-29 future applications committee. He also helped to found the Aerospace Short Course program at the University of Kansas in 1977, which has grown into a global leader for aerospace professional development and training, and still teaches for the program.

Roskam founded the Design, Analysis and Research Corporation (DARcorporation) in 1991 with Willem Anemaat in Lawrence, Kansas and served as the company's president until 2004. The main focus of the company is design consultation, software and textbooks in the aviation field. The company developed its own aircraft design software, Advanced Aircraft Analysis (AAA), as well as a second design program for a NASA Small Business Innovative Research contract.

In 2002 he published Roskam's Airplane War Stories a collection of stories about airplane design and analysis and engineering mistakes that were made. Many of the stories are based on his own experiences and have previously been used to demonstrate to young engineers that "when we make mistakes, we kill people". Roskam has written eleven books on airplane design and flight dynamics.

Shortly before his retirement in 2003 Roskam was honored with the Chancellor's Club Award for career teaching for his history of outstanding teaching. His former students include former president and CEO of Boeing Commercial Airplanes Alan Mulally. Mulally calls Roskam one of his heroes and notes that he learned important skills such as team-building during Roskam's courses. Roskam is also credited with helping Mulally get his first job at Boeing.

The American Institute of Aeronautics and Astronautics presented him with the AIAA Aircraft Design Award in 2007. The award is given each year for advancements in the area of aircraft design, in Roskam's case the award was to recognize his lifetime contribution to the fields of airplane and configuration design and education.

Works

Books

Airplane Design
 Part I: Preliminary Sizing of Airplanes (1985)
 Part II: Preliminary Configuration Design and Integration of the Propulsion System (1985)
 Part III: Layout Design of Cockpit, Fuselage, Wing and Empennage: Cutaways and Inboard Profiles (1986)
 Part IV: Layout of Landing Gear and Systems (1986)
 Part V: Component Weight Estimation (1985)
 Part VI: Preliminary Calculation of Aerodynamic, Thrust and Power Characteristics (1987)
 Part VII: Determination of Stability, Control and Performance Characteristics: FAR and Military Requirements (1986)
 Part VIII: Airplane Cost Estimation: Design, Development, Manufacturing and Operating (1990)
Airplane Flight Dynamics and Automated Flight Controls I-II (1995)
Airplane Aerodynamics and Performance with Dr. Chuan-Tau Edward Lan (1997)
Roskam's Airplane War Stories: An Account of the Professional Life and Work of Dr. Jan Roskam, Airplane Designer and Teacher (2002)
Lessons Learned in Aircraft Design (2007)

Awards
 AIAA Piper Award (1986) for "outstanding contributions to the design of general aviation airplanes as an author, educator, consultant and researcher"
 AIAA Atwood Award (1987) for "outstanding contributions in aerospace education particularly in the areas of design and flight dynamics, and for his contributions to the understanding of interior noise transmission, the development of three surface aircraft and the use of natural laminar flow"
 Chancellor's Club Career Teaching Award (2003)
 AIAA Aircraft Design Award (2007) for "lifetime achievement in airplane design, airplane design education, configuration design, and flight dynamics education"
 Higuchi/Endowment Research Achievement Award
 Ned N. Fleming Trust Award for excellence in teaching
 Governor of Kansas General Aviation Award
 University of Kansas 2016 Distinguished Engineering Service Award

Professional organization memberships
American Institute of Aeronautics and Astronautics (AIAA) - Fellow
Society of Automotive Engineers (SAE) - Fellow
Royal Aeronautical Society - Associate Fellow

References

External links
Aerospace Short Course program, University of Kansas Lifelong & Professional Education
DARcorporation

Living people
1930 births
Aircraft designers
American aerospace engineers
Dutch aerospace engineers
Dutch emigrants to the United States
University of Kansas faculty
University of Washington College of Engineering alumni
Delft University of Technology alumni
Engineers from The Hague